Jim, Jimmy, or James Norton may refer to:

Actors
 James Norton (actor) (born 1985), English actor
 Jim Norton (Irish actor) (born 1938), Irish actor
 Jim Norton (comedian) (born 1968), American comedian and actor

Politicians
 James Norton Jr. (1824–1906), his son, politician in colonial New South Wales
 James A. Norton (1843–1912), U.S. Representative from Ohio
 James Norton (South Carolina politician) (1843–1920), U.S. Representative from South Carolina

Sportspeople
 Jim Norton (safety) (1938–2007), American football player for the Houston Oilers
 Jim Norton (defensive lineman) (born 1942), American football player for the San Francisco 49ers and Atlanta Falcons
 Jim Norton (rugby league), Australian rugby league footballer who played in the 1930s

Other people
 James Norton (admiral) (1789–1835), British navy officer
 James Norton (solicitor) (1795–1862), solicitor, company director, farmer, pamphleteer and protectionist politician in colonial New South Wales
 James Lansdowne Norton (1869–1925), motorcycle designer, inventor and manufacturer of the Norton motorcycles